COPE may refer to:

 Cadena COPE, the Spanish private national radio of the Spanish Catholic Church
 Canadian Office and Professional Employees Union, a Canadian labour union
 Center for Organic Photonics and Electronics at Georgia Institute of Technology College of Sciences
 Coalition of Progressive Electors, a municipal political party in Vancouver, British Columbia, Canada
 Coalition on Psychiatric Emergencies, an American medical collaborative focused on behavioral health and emergency medicine
 Committee on Political Education, the political arm of the AFL–CIO
 Committee On Public Enterprises (Sri Lanka), a parliamentary committee of Sri Lanka
 Committee on Publication Ethics, a nonprofit organization
 Communications Opportunity, Promotion and Enhancement Bill of 2006, aka the Barton/COPE Act (HR 5252
 Congress of the People (South African political party), a political party formed in 2008 in South Africa
 COPE (gene), a human gene that encodes the protein coatomer subunit epsilon
 COPE (film), a 2007 psychological thriller/horror independent film
 Council of Pacific Education, a regional branch of Education International, the global federation of teachers' trade unions
 COPE (BSA), a Boy Scouts of America program designed to develop a Challenging Outdoor Personal Experience
 Company Owned/Personally Enabled, IT business strategy through which an organization provides its employees with computing resources and devices, for a purely professional usage; see Bring your own device#Corporate-owned, personally enabled (COPE)

See also 
 Cope (disambiguation)